Lee Chien-lung is a Taiwanese politician from New Taipei City and a member of the Kuomintang (KMT). He is the current Secretary-General of Kuomintang serving under Chairman Johnny Chiang. Lee previously served as the Chairman of the KMT New Taipei City Chapter, Commissioner of the New Taipei City Department of Civil Affairs, and Mayor of Sanchong City, Taipei County. Lee ran unsuccessfully for a New Taipei City seat in the Legislative Yuan during both the 2012 and 2016 Taiwanese legislative election.

Living people
1949 births
Kuomintang politicians in Taiwan
Feng Chia University alumni
Fu Jen Catholic University alumni
Mayors of places in Taiwan